Gabriel Germán Colombatti (born 2 June 1990) is an Argentine footballer who plays for Italian Eccellenza club Don Carlo Misilmeri.

Career
Born in San Francisco, Córdoba, Grandis began playing football in the youth systems of Sportivo Belgrano and Boca Juniors. He signed his first professional contract with Racing Club de Avellaneda, but did not appear in any matches with the first team, instead making his Primera B Nacional debut while on loan at Deportivo Merlo. Colombatti joined his hometown club Sportivo Belgrano following their historic promotion to the Primera B Nacional in 2013. He played sparingly over four seasons, leaving the club for Club Atlético Colegiales in 2016.

Colombatti moved to Italy where he played for Serie D sides U.S. Palmese 1912 and U.S.D. Città di Fasano.

On 8 July 2019, Italian club Giugliano announced the signing of Colombatti. He left the club in December 2019 to join fellow Serie D club Corigliano. In August 2020, Colombatti joined fellow league club Notaresco. 

In December 2021, Colombatti signed for Eccellenza side L'Aquila. In July 2022, he joined Don Carlo Misilmeri.

References

External links
 
 

1990 births
Living people
Argentine footballers
Argentine expatriate footballers
Racing Club de Avellaneda footballers
Sportivo Belgrano footballers
Deportivo Merlo footballers
Club Atlético Colegiales (Argentina) players
U.S.D. Città di Fasano players
L'Aquila Calcio 1927 players
Eccellenza players
Serie D players
Primera Nacional players
Primera B Metropolitana players
Torneo Federal A players
Argentine expatriate sportspeople in Italy
Expatriate footballers in Italy
Association football central defenders
People from San Francisco, Córdoba
Sportspeople from Córdoba Province, Argentina